The integration of the Caribbean telephone networks into the North American Numbering Plan (NANP) began with the assignment of area codes in the Caribbean in 1958, when area code 809 was designated for Bermuda and any other potential participant island countries.

From 1958 to 1999, most of the British West Indies in the Caribbean Basin, Bermuda, the U.S. Virgin Islands, the Dominican Republic and Puerto Rico shared area code 809.  By the mid-1990s, with the proliferation of fax machines, mobile phones, computers, and pagers in the region, the pool of available central office codes was exhausting. Beginning with Bermuda in November 1994, and The Bahamas, Puerto Rico, and Barbados in 1995, several countries in the Caribbean received individual area code assignments from the NANPA, effectively splitting area code 809. By 1999, it was retained only by the Dominican Republic, following the departure of Saint Vincent and the Grenadines from using the area code.

Assignments

Sint Maarten was part of the Netherlands Antilles until its dissolution in 2010. It is a constituent country within the Kingdom of the Netherlands. Sint Maarten used the country code +599 of the Netherlands Antilles until joining the NANP on September 30, 2011, with area code 721.

Former assignments within 809
The following was the 1958-1995 numbering plan for 809. Starting in the 1980s, Puerto Rico, Bermuda and the Dominican Republic began to use prefixes from unused ranges throughout the 2xx to 9xx range. Historic (1960s-mid-1980s) ranges are shown in parentheses.

The number pool of the area code was divided between the regions by the national number, which was from two to four digits long, leaving five to three digits, respectively, of the total of 10 digits of a complete telephone number for local telephone number assignments. The national number appeared in local telephone directories. 

Caribbean nations with a larger numbering resource requirement used seven-digit dialing, and had no need for a national number.

Non-NANP jurisdictions (i.e., the rest of the world) identified a Caribbean calling destination by analyzing the first six digits dialed (1809xx), therefore, faced the difficulty where a seventh digit was required to identify the specific nation. Rates based on destination would have to be the same for all destinations sharing the same six digits, e.g., St. Lucia and St. Vincent would have to be the same rate; Anguilla, British Virgin Islands and Montserrat would need to be the same rate; Antigua, Barbuda, Nevis and St. Kitts also would have to be the same rate.  Since Cable and Wireless was the provider in most or all cases, the same corporate entity benefited from the revenue for incoming calls.  The assignment of new area codes after 1994 resolved this since only the first four digits would be required to distinguish each country.

In chart above, digits in italics were just the initial digit(s) of seven-digit number dialing.

Sint Maarten was part of +599 until long after 809 was totally divided into individual area codes.

Source for above info: Incumbent provider Cable and Wireless Telephone-directory from Barbados of 1994-1995.

Other territories
Not all of the Caribbean islands are members of the North American Numbering Plan. The following countries have country codes assigned by the International Telecommunication Union (ITU).

See also
809 scam
List of NANP area codes
North American Numbering Plan expansion
Telephone numbers in the Americas
List of country calling codes
:Category:Telephone numbers by country

References

External links
North American Numbering Plan Administrator (NANPA)
Eastern Caribbean Telecommunications Authority (ECTEL)

 
Telephone numbers